Butcher of the Balkans is a sobriquet that has been used for the following individuals:

Andrija Artuković (1899–1988), Croatian fascist politician, Porajmos perpetrator, perpetrator of the genocide of the Serbs, and a minister of the Independent State of Croatia
Ante Pavelić (1889–1959), Croatian fascist politician, Porajmos perpetrator, perpetrator of the genocide of the Serbs, and leader of the Independent State of Croatia
Slobodan Milošević (1941–2006), the former president of Serbia and the Federal Republic of Yugoslavia
Ratko Mladić (born 1942), a Bosnian Serb general during the Bosnian War, convicted perpetrator of the genocide of the Bosniaks
Radovan Karadžić (born 1945), served as Bosnian Serb president during Bosnian War,  convicted perpetrator of the genocide of the Bosniaks

In fiction

Henrik Willemse, a villain in the last Little Orphan Annie (2010) arc, continued in Dick Tracy (2014)